Thomas Dale Akers (born May 20, 1951) is a former  American astronaut in NASA's Space Shuttle program.

Education
Akers was the valedictorian of his 29-member 1969 senior class from Eminence, Missouri.  He worked summers as a park ranger in the 80,000 acre federal wilderness that borders Eminence.  He graduated from the University of Missouri-Rolla (now the Missouri University of Science and Technology) with B.S. and M.S. degrees in applied mathematics in 1973 and 1975, respectively.  At the age of 24, he returned to Eminence to become its math teacher, and subsequently its high school principal.  In 1979, when a United States Air Force recruiter left brochures on his desk for his students, it was Akers who decided to sign up.  He was selected for the astronaut program in 1987 and officially became an astronaut in 1988.  As part of his training with NASA, Akers taught science classes at Troy State University for a brief period of time.

NASA career
Akers is a veteran of four shuttle flights in which he spent over 800 hours in orbit, including more than 29 hours of extra-vehicular activity (EVA) experience. In each of his flights, his role was as a mission specialist.

STS-41
His first space flight was in 1990 on STS-41, the 11th flight of Space Shuttle Discovery. He was instrumental in deploying the European Space Agency satellite Ulysses, a solar-exploration craft, as well as tending several secondary payloads and experiments.

STS-49

His next mission was in 1992 on STS-49, the maiden flight of Shuttle Endeavour. A primary goal of that mission was to capture and repair the non-functional Intelsat VI-F3 satellite. The first two attempts failed; Akers joined the third attempt which was successful. This marks the first three-person EVA in human history and was also the longest EVA (8 hours, 29 minutes) ever conducted to that time.

STS-61
On Akers' third mission in 1993 on STS-61,  the fifth flight of Endeavour, he was one of four mission specialists who repaired and upgraded the Hubble Space Telescope on its first servicing mission. Akers spent just under 13.5 hours outside the Endeavour in two EVAs.

On May 18, 1994, Akers appeared on Home Improvement as himself along with rest of the STS-61 crew.

STS-79
His last mission was in 1996 on STS-79, the 17th flight of shuttle Atlantis. This was the fourth shuttle flight to rendezvous with the Russian space station Mir and the first to exchange U.S. astronauts with Mir, returning Shannon Lucid to earth and leaving John Blaha.

After NASA

Akers retired from NASA in 1997 and the Air Force in 1999 at the rank of colonel, taking a position as instructor of Mathematics at the University of Missouri–Rolla, which in 2008 changed its name to the Missouri University of Science and Technology. Akers retired from teaching in 2010.

Other work
Akers made a cameo appearance on the TV show Home Improvement by Touchstone Television. In Series 3, Episode 24, "Reality Bytes", Akers and the Hubble crew appeared as guests on Tool Time and showed some of the tools they used in space. They also brought a video showing the first Tim Taylor 'grunt' used in communications during a space walk.

Special honors

High School Valedictorian. Graduated summa cum laude from University of Missouri-Rolla. Named a Distinguished Graduate of U.S. Air Force Officer Training School, Squadron Officer School, and U.S. Air Force Test Pilot School. Recipient of the Defense Superior Service Medal with two oak leaf clusters; Legion of Merit Award; Defense Meritorious Service Medal; Air Force Meritorious Service Medal; Air Force Commendation Medal; Air Force Achievement Medal; NASA Distinguished Service Medal; two NASA Exceptional Service Medals; four NASA Space Flight Medals. Awarded an honorary Doctorate of Engineering from the University of Missouri-Rolla in 1992. Awarded ten Outstanding Teacher awards from UMR/S&T 2000–2010, and the Missouri Governors Teaching Award 2004.

References

External links
NASA Astronaut bio: T. Akers, September 2020
Spacefacts biography of Thomas Akers
Spaceflight mission report: STS-41
Spaceflight mission report: STS-49
Spaceflight mission report: STS-61
Spaceflight mission report: STS-79
Article "Astronaut to Math Teacher"
 

1951 births
 Living people
 United States Air Force astronauts
 People from Shannon County, Missouri
 Missouri University of Science and Technology alumni
 Missouri University of Science and Technology faculty
 U.S. Air Force Test Pilot School alumni
 United States Air Force officers
 American test pilots
 Recipients of the Legion of Merit
 Recipients of the Defense Superior Service Medal
 Recipients of the NASA Distinguished Service Medal
 Recipients of the NASA Exceptional Service Medal
 Space Shuttle program astronauts
 Mathematicians from Missouri
 Scientists from Missouri
 Recipients of the Meritorious Service Medal (United States)
 Spacewalkers
 Mir crew members